The Protected areas of New South Wales include both  terrestrial and marine protected areas.   there are 225 national parks in New South Wales.

Based on the Collaborative Australian Protected Area Database (CAPAD) 2020 data there are 2136 separate terrestrial protected areas with a total land area of  (9.61% of the state's area).

History
New South Wales established the first known protected area in Australia, Royal National Park in 1879. The formation of the NSW National Parks and Wildlife Service in 1967 saw a bid in the conservation of the state's diversity of natural ecosystems and cultural heritage. Today New South Wales contains more than 16.4 million acres within 870 protected areas, as well as 225 different national parks, each with their own pristine beauty and tranquil scenery.

New conservation areas
It is the largest ever purchase of private land for conservation in the state, and provides 90 percent of the habitat of the endangered grey grasswren. The Dingo Fence on the border with Queensland forms the northern boundary of the property.

The second largest acquisition ever was made in October 2021, Avenel/Mount Westwood station, north of Broken Hill, comprising 121,390 ha (299,961 acres). A further 60,416 ha (149,291 acres) of private land, Langidoon and Metford stations, located 65 kilometres east of Broken Hill was also purchased and gazetted in 2021. Koonaburra station, 45,534 ha (112,517 acres) located between Ivanhoe and Cobar, was also purchased and gazetted in the same year.

Terrestrial protected areas

National Parks
National parks are managed by the National Parks and Wildlife Service, an agency of the Department of Planning, Industry and Environment of New South Wales.

Central NSW

 Abercrombie River National Park
 Belford National Park
 Breelong National Park
 Capertee National Park
 Cataract National Park
 Cocoparra National Park
 Conimbla National Park
 Coolah Tops National Park
 Drillwarrina National Park
 Garrawilla National Park
 Goobang National Park
 Goulburn River National Park
 Kalyarr National Park
 Mount Kaputar National Park
 Nangar National Park
 Oolambeyan National Park
 Timbarra National Park
 Turon National Park
 Warrumbungle National Park
 Weddin Mountains National Park

Hunter & Mid North Coast

 Bago Bluff National Park
 Barakee National Park
 Barrington Tops National Park
 Bellinger River National Park
 Ben Halls Gap National Park
 Bindarri National Park
 Biriwal Bulga National Park
 Bongil Bongil National Park
 Booti Booti National Park
 Cascade National Park
 Coorabakh National Park
 Crawney Pass National Park
 Crowdy Bay National Park
 Dooragan National Park
 Dorrigo National Park
 Dunggir National Park
 Ghin-Doo-Ee National Park
 Hat Head National Park
 Junuy Juluum National Park
 Kumbatine National Park
 Limeburners Creek National Park
 Maria National Park
 Middle Brother National Park
 Mount Royal National Park
 Myall Lakes National Park
 Nymboi-Binderay National Park
 Saltwater National Park
 Sea Acres National Park
 Tapin Tops National Park
 Tomaree National Park
 Towarri National Park
 Ulidarra National Park
 Wallarah National Park
 Wallingat National Park
 Watagans National Park
 Willi Willi National Park
 Woko National Park
 Yarriabini National Park

Northern Tablelands

 Bald Rock National Park
 Barool National Park
 Basket Swamp National Park
 Boonoo Boonoo National Park
 Butterleaf National Park
 Capoompeta National Park
 Carrai National Park
 Cataract National Park
 Cathedral Rock National Park
 Chaelundi National Park
 Cottan-Bimbang National Park
 Cunnawarra National Park
 Dowe National Park
 Gibraltar Range National Park
 Guy Fawkes River National Park
 Indwarra National Park
 Kings Plains National Park
 Kwiambal National Park
 Mummel Gulf National Park
 New England National Park
 Nowendoc National Park
 Nymboida National Park
 Oxley Wild Rivers National Park
 Single National Park
 Timbarra National Park
 Warra National Park
 Warrabah National Park
 Washpool National Park
 Werrikimbe National Park

Northern Rivers

 Arakwal National Park
 Border Ranges National Park
 Broadwater National Park
 Bundjalung National Park
 Bungawalbin National Park
 Fortis Creek National Park
 Goonengerry National Park
 Koreelah National Park
 Mallanganee National Park
 Maryland National Park
 Mebbin National Park
 Mooball National Park
 Mount Clunie National Park
 Mount Jerusalem National Park
 Mount Nothofagus National Park
 Mount Pikapene National Park
 Mount Warning National Park
 Nightcap National Park
 Ramornie National Park
 Richmond Range National Park
 Tooloom National Park
 Toonumbar National Park
 Wollumbin National Park
 Yabbra National Park
 Yuraygir National Park

Outback NSW

 Burral Yurrul National Park
 Couradda National Park
 Culgoa National Park
 Gundabooka National Park
 Kinchega National Park
 Mallee Cliffs National Park
 Mungo National Park
 Mutawintji National Park
 Narran Lake Nature Reserve
 Narriearra Caryapundy Swamp National Park
 Paroo-Darling National Park
 Sturt National Park
 Toorale National Park
 Willandra National Park
 Yanga National Park

South Coast & Highlands

 Bangadilly National Park
 Benambra National Park
 Beowa National Park
 Biamanga National Park
 Bimberamala National Park
 Bournda National Park
 Brindabella National Park
 Budawang National Park
 Budderoo National Park
 Bugong National Park
 Clyde River National Park
 Conjola National Park
 Deua National Park
 Eurobodalla National Park
 Gourock National Park
 Gulaga National Park
 Jerrawangala National Park
 Jervis Bay National Park
 Kooraban National Park
 Kosciuszko National Park
 Livingstone National Park
 Mares Forest National Park
 Macquarie Pass National Park
 Meroo National Park
 Mimosa Rocks National Park
 Minjary National Park
 Monga National Park
 Morton National Park
 Mount Imlay National Park
 Murramarang National Park
 Seven Mile Beach National Park
 South East Forests National Park
 Tallaganda National Park
 Tarlo River National Park
 Wadbilliga National Park
 Woomargama National Park
 Yanununbeyan National Park

Sydney & Surrounds

 Berowra Valley National Park
 Blue Mountains National Park
 Bouddi National Park
 Brisbane Water National Park
 Cattai National Park
 Dharawal National Park
 Dharug National Park
 Gardens of Stone National Park
 Garigal National Park
 Georges River National Park
 Heathcote National Park
 Kamay Botany Bay National Park
 Kanangra-Boyd National Park
 Ku-ring-gai Chase National Park
 Lane Cove National Park
 Malabar Headland National Park
 Marramarra National Park
 Nattai National Park
 Popran National Park
 Royal National Park
 Scheyville National Park
 Sydney Harbour National Park
 Thirlmere Lakes National Park
 Werakata National Park
 Wollemi National Park
 Wyrrabalong National Park
 Yengo National Park

Nature Reserves

Nature Reserves are managed by the National Parks and Wildlife Service, an agency of the Department of Environment and Climate Change of New South Wales.

Central NSW

 Arakoola Nature Reserve
 Avisford Nature Reserve
 Barton Nature Reserve
 Binnaway Nature Reserve
 Boomi Nature Reserve
 Boomi West Nature Reserve
 Boronga Nature Reserve
 Brigalow Park Nature Reserve
 Budelah Nature Reserve
 Careunga Nature Reserve
 Coolbaggie Nature Reserve
 Copperhannia Nature Reserve
 Dapper Nature Reserve
 Donnybrook Nature Reserve
 Dural Nature Reserve
 Eugowra Nature Reserve
 Freemantle Nature Reserve
 Gamilaroi Nature Reserve
 Girralang Nature Reserve
 Kemps Creek Nature Reserve
 Kirramingly Nature Reserve
 Koorawatha Nature Reserve
 Kuma Nature Reserve
 Macquarie Marshes Nature Reserve
 Midkin Nature Reserve
 Munghorn Gap Nature Reserve
 Narran Lake Nature Reserve
 Pilliga Nature Reserve
 Planchonella Nature Reserve
 The Rock Nature Reserve
 Tollingo Nature Reserve
 Turallo Nature Reserve
 Wambool Nature Reserve
 Weetalibah Nature Reserve
 Winburndale Nature Reserve
 Woggoon Nature Reserve
 Wongarbon Nature Reserve
 Yaegl Nature Reserve
 Yarringully Nature Reserve

Hunter & Mid North Coast

 Awabakal Nature Reserve
 Baalijin Nature Reserve
 Back River Nature Reserve
 Bagul Waajaarr Nature Reserve
 Bandicoot Island Nature Reserve
 Bird Island Nature Reserve
 Bollanolla Nature Reserve
 Boonanghi Nature Reserve
 Boondelbah Nature Reserve
 Boorganna Nature Reserve
 Bowraville Nature Reserve
 Bretti Nature Reserve
 Brimbin Nature Reserve
 Bugan Nature Reserve
 Burning Mountain Nature Reserve
 Bushy Island Nature Reserve
 Camels Hump Nature Reserve
 Camerons Gorge Nature Reserve
 Cedar Brush Nature Reserve
 Coocumbac Island Nature Reserve
 Coolongolook Nature Reserve
 Cooperabung Creek Nature Reserve
 Coramba Nature Reserve
 Corrie Island Nature Reserve
 Coxcomb Nature Reserve
 Darawank Nature Reserve
 Fifes Knob Nature Reserve
 Fishermans Bend Nature Reserve
 Gads Sugarloaf Nature Reserve
 Ganay Nature Reserve
 Garby Nature Reserve
 Goonook Nature Reserve
 Hexham Swamp Nature Reserve
 Jaaningga Nature Reserve
 Jagun Nature Reserve
 Jasper Nature Reserve
 John Gould Nature Reserve
 Juugawaarri Nature Reserve
 Karuah Nature Reserve
 Kattang Nature Reserve
 Khappinghat Nature Reserve
 Khatambuhl Nature Reserve
 Killabakh Nature Reserve
 Killarney Nature Reserve
 Kooragang Nature Reserve
 Koorebang Nature Reserve
 Kororo Nature Reserve
 Lake Innes Nature Reserve
 Little Broughton Island Nature Reserve
 Macquarie Nature Reserve
 Mernot Nature Reserve
 Mills Island Nature Reserve
 Moffats Swamp Nature Reserve
 Monkerai Nature Reserve
 Monkeycot Nature Reserve
 Moon Island Nature Reserve
 Moonee Beach Nature Reserve
 Mount Seaview Nature Reserve
 Muttonbird Island Nature Reserve
 Ngambaa Nature Reserve
 North Rock Nature Reserve
 One Tree Island Nature Reserve
 Pambalong Nature Reserve
 Pee Dee Nature Reserve
 Pulbah Island Nature Reserve
 Queens Lake Nature Reserve
 Rawdon Creek Nature Reserve
 Regatta Island Nature Reserve
 Running Creek Nature Reserve
 Seaham Swamp Nature Reserve
 Seal Rocks Nature Reserve
 Skillion Nature Reserve
 Snapper Island Nature Reserve
 Stormpetrel Nature Reserve
 Talawahl Nature Reserve
 The Castles Nature Reserve
 The Glen Nature Reserve
 Tilligerry Nature Reserve
 Tingira Heights Nature Reserve
 Tomalla Nature Reserve
 Towibakh Nature Reserve
 Valla Nature Reserve
 Wallabadah Nature Reserve
 Wallamba Nature Reserve
 Wallaroo Nature Reserve
 Wallis Island Nature Reserve
 Weelah Nature Reserve
 Willi Willi Caves Nature Reserve
 Wingen Maid Nature Reserve
 Wingham Brush Nature Reserve
 Worimi Nature Reserve
 Yahoo Island Nature Reserve
 Yarravel Nature Reserve
 Yessabah Nature Reserve

New England Tablelands

 Aberbaldie Nature Reserve
 Bluff River Nature Reserve
 Bolivia Hill Nature Reserve
 Booroolong Nature Reserve
 Burnt-Down Scrub Nature Reserve
 Deer Vale Nature Reserve
 Demon Nature Reserve
 Duval Nature Reserve
 Georges Creek Nature Reserve
 Gibraltar Nature Reserve
 Guy Fawkes River Nature Reserve
 Imbota Nature Reserve
 Ironbark Nature Reserve
 Jobs Mountain Nature Reserve
 Linton Nature Reserve
 Little Llangothlin Nature Reserve
 Mann River Nature Reserve
 Melville Range Nature Reserve
 Mother Of Ducks Lagoon Nature Reserve
 Mount Hyland Nature Reserve
 Mount Mackenzie Nature Reserve
 Mount Yarrowyck Nature Reserve
 Muldiva Nature Reserve
 Ngulin Nature Reserve
 Serpentine Nature Reserve
 Severn River Nature Reserve
 Stony Batter Creek Nature Reserve
 The Basin Nature Reserve
 Tuggolo Creek Nature Reserve
 Watsons Creek Nature Reserve
 Yina Nature Reserve

Northern Rivers

 Andrew Johnston Big Scrub Nature Reserve
 Ballina Nature Reserve
 Banyabba Nature Reserve
 Billinudgel Nature Reserve
 Boatharbour Nature Reserve
 Broken Head Nature Reserve
 Brunswick Heads Nature Reserve
 Bungabbee Nature Reserve
 Bungawalbin Nature Reserve
 Byrnes Scrub Nature Reserve
 Captains Creek Nature Reserve
 Chambigne Nature Reserve
 Chapmans Peak Nature Reserve
 Clarence Estuary Nature Reserve
 Cook Island Nature Reserve
 Couchy Creek Nature Reserve
 Cudgen Nature Reserve
 Cumbebin Swamp Nature Reserve
 Davis Scrub Nature Reserve
 Flaggy Creek Nature Reserve
 Hattons Bluff Nature Reserve
 Hayters Hill Nature Reserve
 Hogarth Range Nature Reserve
 Hortons Creek Nature Reserve
 Iluka Nature Reserve
 Inner Pocket Nature Reserve
 Julian Rocks Nature Reserve
 Koukandowie Nature Reserve
 Limpinwood Nature Reserve
 Little Pimlico Island Nature Reserve
 Marshalls Creek Nature Reserve
 Moore Park Nature Reserve
 Mororo Creek Nature Reserve
 Mount Neville Nature Reserve
 Mount Nullum Nature Reserve
 Muckleewee Mountain Nature Reserve
 Munro Island Nature Reserve
 North-West Solitary Island Nature Reserve
 North Obelisk Nature Reserve
 North Solitary Island Nature Reserve
 Numinbah Nature Reserve
 Richmond River Nature Reserve
 Sherwood Nature Reserve
 Snows Gully Nature Reserve
 South West Solitary Island Nature Reserve
 Split Solitary Island Nature Reserve
 Stotts Island Nature Reserve
 Susan Island Nature Reserve
 Tabbimoble Swamp Nature Reserve
 Tallawudjah Nature Reserve
 Tuckean Nature Reserve
 Tucki Tucki Nature Reserve
 Tweed Estuary Nature Reserve
 Tyagarah Nature Reserve
 Ukerebagh Nature Reserve
 Uralba Nature Reserve
 Victoria Park Nature Reserve
 Waragai Creek Nature Reserve
 Wilson Nature Reserve
 Woodford Island Nature Reserve
 Wooyung Nature Reserve

Outback NSW

 Big Bush Nature Reserve
 Boginderra Hills Nature Reserve
 Buddigower Nature Reserve
 Burral Yurrul Nature Reserve
 Cocopara Nature Reserve
 Goonawarra Nature Reserve
 Gubbata Nature Reserve
 Ingalba Nature Reserve
 Jerilderie Nature Reserve
 Kajuligah Nature Reserve
 Kemendok Nature Reserve
 Lake Urana Nature Reserve
 Langtree Nature Reserve
 Ledknapper Nature Reserve
 Loughnan Nature Reserve
 Morrisons Lake Nature Reserve
 Mutawintji Nature Reserve
 Narrandera Nature Reserve
 Nearie Lake Nature Reserve
 Nocoleche Nature Reserve
 Nombinnie Nature Reserve
 Pucawan Nature Reserve
 Pulletop Nature Reserve
 Quanda Nature Reserve
 Round Hill Nature Reserve
 Tarawi Nature Reserve
 Charcoal Tank Nature Reserve
 Yanga Nature Reserve
 Yathong Nature Reserve

South Coast & Highlands

 Araluen Nature Reserve
 Badja Swamps Nature Reserve
 Bamarang Nature Reserve
 Barren Grounds Nature Reserve
 Barrengarry Nature Reserve
 Bees Nest Nature Reserve
 Bell Bird Creek Nature Reserve
 Belowla Island Nature Reserve
 Bermaguee Nature Reserve
 Bimberi Nature Reserve
 Binjura Nature Reserve
 Black Andrew Nature Reserve
 Black Ash Nature Reserve
 Bobundara Nature Reserve
 Bogandyera Nature Reserve
 Bondi Gulf Nature Reserve
 Bournda Nature Reserve
 Broulee Island Nature Reserve
 Brundee Swamp Nature Reserve
 Brush Island Nature Reserve
 Burnt School Nature Reserve
 Burra Creek Nature Reserve
 Burrinjuck Nature Reserve
 Cambewarra Range Nature Reserve
 Cecil Hoskins Nature Reserve
 Clarkes Hill Nature Reserve
 Comerong Island Nature Reserve
 Coolumbooka Nature Reserve
 Coornartha Nature Reserve
 Courabyra Nature Reserve
 Cullendulla Creek Nature Reserve
 Cuumbeun Nature Reserve
 Dananbilla Nature Reserve
 Dangelong Nature Reserve
 Devils Glen Nature Reserve
 Downfall Nature Reserve
 Eagles Claw Nature Reserve
 Egan Peaks Nature Reserve
 Ellerslie Nature Reserve
 Five Islands Nature Reserve
 Flagstaff Memorial Nature Reserve
 Good Good Nature Reserve
 Goorooyarroo Nature Reserve
 Gungewalla Nature Reserve
 Hattons Corner Nature Reserve
 Illawong Nature Reserve
 Illunie Nature Reserve
 Ironmungy Nature Reserve
 Jerralong Nature Reserve
 Jingellic Nature Reserve
 Joadja Nature Reserve
 Kangaroo River Nature Reserve
 Kybeyan Nature Reserve
 Meringo Nature Reserve
 Merriangaah Nature Reserve
 Montague Island Nature Reserve
 Mount Clifford Nature Reserve
 Mount Dowling Nature Reserve
 Mudjarn Nature Reserve
 Mullengandra Nature Reserve
 Mundoonen Nature Reserve
 Myalla Nature Reserve
 Nadgee Nature Reserve
 Nadgigomar Nature Reserve
 Narrawallee Creek Nature Reserve
 Nest Hill Nature Reserve
 Ngadang Nature Reserve
 Nimmo Nature Reserve
 Numeralla Nature Reserve
 Oak Creek Nature Reserve
 Parma Creek Nature Reserve
 Paupong Nature Reserve
 Queanbeyan Nature Reserve
 Quidong Nature Reserve
 Razorback Nature Reserve
 Robertson Nature Reserve
 Rodway Nature Reserve
 Saltwater Swamp Nature Reserve
 Scabby Range Nature Reserve
 Scott Nature Reserve
 Stony Creek Nature Reserve
 Strike-a-Light Nature Reserve
 Tabletop Nature Reserve
 Tapitallee Nature Reserve
 Tinderry Nature Reserve
 Tollgate Islands Nature Reserve
 Triplarina Nature Reserve
 Ulandra Nature Reserve
 Undoo Nature Reserve
 Wadjan Nature Reserve
 Wanna Wanna Nature Reserve
 Wee Jasper Nature Reserve
 Wiesners Swamp Nature Reserve
 Wogamia Nature Reserve
 Wollondilly River Nature Reserve
 Woollamia Nature Reserve
 Worrigee Nature Reserve
 Wullwye Nature Reserve
 Yanununbeyan Nature Reserve
 Yaouk Nature Reserve
 Yatteyattah Nature Reserve

Sydney & Surrounds

 Agnes Banks Nature Reserve
 Berkeley Nature Reserve
 Castlereagh Nature Reserve
 Central Gardens Nature Reserve
 Cockle Bay Nature Reserve
 Dalrymple-Hay Nature Reserve
 Dharawal Nature Reserve
 Evans Crown Nature Reserve
 Gulguer Nature Reserve
 Lion Island Nature Reserve
 Long Island Nature Reserve
 Manobalai Nature Reserve
 Mulgoa Nature Reserve
 Muogamarra Nature Reserve
 Newington Nature Reserve
 Pelican Island Nature Reserve
 Pitt Town Nature Reserve
 Prospect Nature Reserve
 Rileys Island Nature Reserve
 Spectacle Island Nature Reserve
 Towra Point Nature Reserve
 Wallumatta Nature Reserve
 Wamberal Lagoon Nature Reserve
 Wambina Nature Reserve
 Windsor Downs Nature Reserve

State Conservation Areas
State Conservation Areas, formerly referred to as State Recreation Areas, are managed by the Department of Environment and Climate Change.

Central NSW

 Avondale State Conservation Area
 Banyabba State Conservation Area
 Berlang State Conservation Area
 Bindarri State Conservation Area
 Bundjalung State Conservation Area
 Carrai State Conservation Area
 Cascade State Conservation Area
 Chaelundi State Conservation Area
 Chatsworth Hill State Conservation Area
 Coneac State Conservation Area
 Corymbia State Conservation Area
 Cottan-Bimbang State Conservation Area
 Curracabundi State Conservation Area
 Currys Gap State Conservation Area
 Frogs Hole State Conservation Area
 Gurranang State Conservation Area
 Guy Fawkes River State Conservation Area
 Jackywalbin State Conservation Area
 Karuah State Conservation Area
 Kooyong State Conservation Area
 Kumbatine State Conservation Area
 Kybeyan State Conservation Area
 Laurence Road State Conservation Area
 Livingstone State Conservation Area
 Macanally State Conservation Area
 Majors Creek State Conservation Area
 Medowie State Conservation Area
 Mount Canobolas State Conservation Area
 Mugii Murum-ban State Conservation Area
 Mullion Range State Conservation Area
 Mummel Gulf State Conservation Area
 Nymboi-Binderai State Conservation Area
 Nymboida State Conservation Area
 Oxley Wild Rivers State Conservation Area
 Polblue State Conservation Area
 Talawahl State Conservation Area
 Tallaganda State Conservation Area
 The Cells State Conservation Area
 Toonumbar State Conservation Area
 Washpool State Conservation Area
 Wereboldera State Conservation Area
 Wombat Creek State Conservation Area
 Yarringully State Conservation Area
 Yurammie State Conservation Area
 Yuraygir State Conservation Area

Hunter & Mid North Coast
 Arakoon State Conservation Area
 Barrington Tops State Conservation Area
 Black Bulga State Conservation Area
 Copeland Tops State Conservation Area
 Glenrock State Conservation Area
 Gumbaynggirr State Conservation Area
 Queens Lake State Conservation Area

New England Tablelands
 Butterleaf State Conservation Area
 Mount Hyland State Conservation Area
 Torrington State Conservation Area

Northern Rivers
 Cape Byron State Conservation Area
 Whian Whian State Conservation Area
 Wollumbin State Conservation Area

Outback NSW
 Gundabooka State Conservation Area
 Nombinnie State Conservation Area
 Paroo-Darling State Conservation Area
 Toorale State Conservation Area

South Coast & Highlands
 Bargo State Conservation Area
 Bargo River State Conservation Area
 Barnunj State Conservation Area
 Berlang State Conservation Area
 Brindabella State Conservation Area
 Bungonia State Conservation Area
 Colymea State Conservation Area
 Corramy State Conservation Area
 Illawarra Escarpment State Conservation Area
 Macquarie Pass State Conservation Area
 Majors Creek State Conservation Area
 Monga State Conservation Area
 Morton State Conservation Area
 Tumbalong State Conservation Area
 Yanununbeyan State Conservation Area

Sydney & Surrounds
 Bents Basin State Conservation Area
 Burragorang State Conservation Area
 Dharawal State Conservation Area
 Garawarra State Conservation Area
 Georges River State Conservation Area
 Jilliby State Conservation Area
 Lake Macquarie State Conservation Area
 Munmorah State Conservation Area
 Nattai State Conservation Area
 Parr State Conservation Area
 Yerranderie State Conservation Area

Regional Parks
Regional Parks are managed by the Department of Environment and Climate Change.

Hunter & Mid North Coast
 Coffs Coast Regional Park

South Coast & Highlands
 Bomaderry Creek Regional Park

Sydney & Surrounds
 Berowra Valley Regional Park
 Leacock Regional Park
 Parramatta River Regional Park
 Penrith Lakes Regional Park
 Rouse Hill Regional Park
 Western Sydney Parklands
 William Howe Regional Park
 Wolli Creek Regional Park
 Yellomundee Regional Park

Aboriginal Areas
Aboriginal Areas are managed by local Aboriginal communities and the Department of Environment and Climate Change.

Hunter & Mid North Coast
 Nambucca Aboriginal Area
 Nunguu Mirral Aboriginal Area

New England Tablelands
 Stonewoman Aboriginal Area

Northern Rivers
 Lennox Head Aboriginal Area

Outback NSW
 Pindera Downs Aboriginal Area

South Coast & Highlands
 Murramarang Aboriginal Area

Sydney & Surrounds
 Appletree Aboriginal Area
 Finchley Aboriginal Area
 Howe Aboriginal Area
 Mooney Mooney Aboriginal Area
 Mount Kuring-gai Aboriginal Area

Historic Sites
A number of Historic Sites are managed by the Department of Environment and Climate Change. Other historic sites in the state are managed by the Historic Houses Trust of New South Wales.
 Stony Range Regional Botanic Garden

Central NSW
 Hill End Historic Site
 Innes Ruins Historic Site
 Koonadan Historic Site
 Maynggu Ganai Historic Site
 Yuranighs Aboriginal Grave Historic Site

Hunter & Mid North Coast
 Clybucca Historic Site

Northern Rivers
 Tweed Heads Historic Site

Outback NSW
 Mount Grenfell Historic Site
 Mutawintji Historic Site

South Coast & Highlands
 Davidson Whaling Station Historic Site
 Throsby Park Historic Site

Sydney & Surrounds
 Cadmans Cottage Historic Site
 Hartley Historic Site
 Maroota Historic Site
 Wisemans Ferry Historic Site
 Bantry Bay, New South Wales

State Parks

State Parks are managed by the Land and Property Management Authority.

 Belmont State Park
 Coffs Coast State Park
 Burrinjuck Waters State Park
 Copeton Waters State Park
 Goolawah State Park
 Grabine Lakeside State Park
 Killalea State Park
 Lake Burrendong State Park
 Lake Glenbawn State Park
 Lake Keepit State Park
 Wyangala Waters State Park

Karst Conservation Reserves
Four Karst Conservation Reserves are managed by the Jenolan Caves Reserve Trust.

 Abercrombie Caves
 Borenore Caves
 Jenolan Caves
 Wombeyan Caves

Marine protected areas

Marine Parks
Marine Parks are managed by the New South Wales Marine Parks Authority.

 Batemans Marine Park
 Cape Byron Marine Park
 Jervis Bay Marine Park
 Lord Howe Island Marine Park
 Port Stephens-Great Lakes Marine Park
 Solitary Islands Marine Park

Aquatic reserves
Aquatic reserves are managed by the New South Wales Department of Primary Industries.

 Cook Island Aquatic Reserve, Tweed Heads
 Barrenjoey Head Aquatic Reserve, Hawkesbury River
 Narrabeen Head Aquatic Reserve
 Long Reef Aquatic Reserve
 Cabbage Tree Bay Aquatic Reserve, Manly
 North Harbour Aquatic Reserve, Sydney
 Bronte-Coogee Aquatic Reserve
 Cape Banks Aquatic Reserve, La Perouse
 Boat Harbour Aquatic Reserve, Kurnell
 Towra Point Aquatic Reserve, Botany Bay
 Shiprock Aquatic Reserve, Port Hacking
 Bushrangers Bay Aquatic Reserve, Shellharbour

See also
 List of national parks of Australia
Protected areas of Australia

References

External links
NSW National Parks and Wildlife Service

 
New South Wales
New South Wales-related lists
Lists of tourist attractions in New South Wales